Elections to Manchester Council were held on Thursday, 7 May 1992. One third of the council was up for election, with each successful candidate to serve a four-year term of office, expiring in 1996. The Labour Party retained overall control of the Council.

Election result

After the election, the composition of the council was as follows:

Ward results

Ardwick

Baguley

Barlow Moor

Benchill

Beswick and Clayton

Blackley

Bradford

Brooklands

Burnage

Central

Charlestown

Cheetham

Chorlton

Crumpsall

Didsbury

Fallowfield

Gorton North

Gorton South

Harpurhey

Hulme

Levenshulme

Lightbowne

Longsight

Moss Side

Moston

Newton Heath

Northenden

Old Moat

Rusholme

Sharston

Whalley Range

Withington

Woodhouse Park

References

1992 English local elections
1992
1990s in Manchester